Seward Township, Illinois may refer to one of the following townships:

 Seward Township, Kendall County, Illinois
 Seward Township, Winnebago County, Illinois

See also

Seward Township (disambiguation)

Illinois township disambiguation pages